William C. Gathright (July 7, 1939 – June 29, 2020), known professionally as Willie Wright, was an American soul singer and songwriter, best known for his "rediscovered" 1977 album, Telling the Truth.

Life and career
He was born in Belen, Quitman County, Mississippi, United States.  In his teens he sang with friends George Bragg and Harry Jensen in a Harlem, New York City doo-wop group, The Persuaders.  Later, the three formed the Willie Wright Trio.  Wright then began performing as a solo singer and songwriter in clubs in Greenwich Village, and also played flute with The Three Degrees.  He turned down offers to sign with a major label, and according to his current record label "deliberately chose artistic freedom over the sharecropper's existence to which many of the best artists of his generation were subjected."

He moved to Boston, Massachusetts, where he continued to sing in clubs, setting up his own label, Hotel Records, in 1969, and releasing a single.  In the early 1970s, he released his first album, Lack of Education (aka Too Soon to Know), which mostly contained cover versions of other musicians' songs, including Curtis Mayfield's "Right On For The Darkness".  In 1976 he began performing for tourists and vacationers at Nantucket.  He decided to move there, and started to write more songs.  The following year he recorded a second album, Telling the Truth, in New York.  The album was recorded at low cost in exchange for the singer recording some commercials, but was described by AllMusic as "a deeply personal set that delved into Wright's attitudes about his life, his relationships with women, and the children he'd fathered but left behind", and featured "spare, intimate arrangements...[and] austere production... dictated by the fact it was recorded in a single day."  He again released the album himself, and mainly sold it at performances.

In the early 1990s he moved to Providence, Rhode Island, where he continued to perform.  He retired from live performance in 2002, after recording and releasing a live album, Brother Bill.  "Right On For The Darkness" was included on several compilation albums of rare soul music, and was recognized as a highly collectible record, but Wright remained a relatively obscure figure until 2011, when Telling the Truth was reissued on CD by the Numero Group. The interest that this generated, including comparisons with Bill Withers, led Wright, despite the onset of Parkinson's disease, to record a new album, This Is Not A Dream, in Burlington, Vermont.  The album was issued by Green Coil Records in 2012.

Wright died on June 29, 2020, in Providence, Rhode Island, at the age of 80.

References

External links

 Willie Wright at SoulTracks.com

1939 births
2020 deaths
American soul musicians
Singers from Mississippi
People from Quitman County, Mississippi
20th-century African-American male singers
Argo Records artists